= Martin Atherton =

English author (born 1956)

- Born: 1956 (age 69–70)
- Education: University of Central Lancashire
- Occupations: Professor; writer

Martin Atherton (born 1956) is an English professor and writer. He attended the University of Central Lancashire.

== Early life and education ==
As a child, Atherton had failed multiple Cambridge O-Levels. He eventually re-took them and attended the University of Lancashire.

== Personal life ==
Atherton supports Preston North End F.C.. He is a professor and writer.

== Selected bibliography ==
- Atherton, Martin (2012). Deafness, Community and Culture in Britain: Leisure and Cohesion, 1945–1995. Manchester University Press. ISBN 978-0719084676.
- Atherton, Martin; Hutchison, Iain C.; Virdi, Jaipreet (2020). Disability and the Victorians: Attitudes, Interventions, Legacies. Manchester University Press. ISBN 978-1526151742.
- Atherton, Martin (28 February 2008). The Theft of the Jules Rimet Trophy: The Hidden History of the 1966 World Cup. Meyer & Meyer. ISBN 978-1841262277.
- Atherton, Martin; Harrington, Frank J.; Williams, Janine; Barnes, Lynne (2007). Deaf Students in Higher Education: Current Research and Practice. Coleford, UK: Douglas McLean Publishing. ISBN 978-0946252640.
